Lafayette Place may refer to the following places in the United States:
 Lafayette Place, New York
 Lafayette Place, Boston, Massachusetts
 Lafayette Place, Fort Wayne, Indiana

See also
 Lafayette Square (disambiguation)